Micractis is a genus of African flowering plants in the family Asteraceae.

 Species
 Micractis bojeri DC. 
 Micractis discoidea (Vatke) D.L.Schulz 
 Micractis drosocephala Chiov.

References

Millerieae
Asteraceae genera
Flora of Africa